Muslimabad is a village located in Mardan District, Khyber Pakhtunkhwa, Pakistan.

References

Populated places in Mardan District
Union councils of Mardan District